Beata Barbara Gosiewska (born 6 March 1971) is a Polish politician from Law and Justice. She was a member of the Senate of Poland from 2011 to 2014. She was elected in 2014 as a Member of the European Parliament (MEP) for European Conservatives and Reformists.

She was the second wife of late Polish politician Przemysław Gosiewski who died in Smolensk air disaster in April 2010.

References

External links 
 

1971 births
Living people
People from Wysokie Mazowieckie
Law and Justice politicians
Law and Justice MEPs
Members of the Senate of Poland 2011–2015
Women members of the Senate of Poland
MEPs for Poland 2014–2019
European Conservatives and Reformists MEPs
Women MEPs for Poland
SGH Warsaw School of Economics alumni